The Mother Heart is a 1921 American silent drama film directed by Howard M. Mitchell and starring Shirley Mason, Raymond McKee and Edwin B. Tilton.

Cast
 Shirley Mason as May Howard
 Raymond McKee as Billy Bender
 Edwin B. Tilton as George Stuart
 Cecil Van Auker as John Howard
 William Buckley as Clifford Hamilton
 Peggy Elinor as Ella Howard 
 Frances Hatton as Mrs. Howard 
 Lillian Langdon as Mrs. Lincoln

References

Bibliography
 Solomon, Aubrey. The Fox Film Corporation, 1915-1935: A History and Filmography. McFarland, 2011.

External links
 

1921 films
1921 drama films
1920s English-language films
American silent feature films
Silent American drama films
American black-and-white films
Films directed by Howard M. Mitchell
Fox Film films
1920s American films